Müjde Uzman (born 26 September 1984) is a Turkish actress.

Career 
In 2001, Uzman won the Elite Model Look contest. She then started working as a presenter on a number of music channels.

Uzman started her acting career in 2008 by taking a part in the series Paramparça Aşklar. In 2010, she appeared as a guest on the Kapalı Çarşı and Aşk Bir Hayal series. She subsequently had her breakthrough with recurring roles in Eşkıya Dünyaya Hükümdar Olmaz, Muhteşem Yüzyıl and Kiralık Aşk. Between 2018–2019, she portrayed the character of Funda Turaç in the Savaşçı TV series.

Aside from her career on television, she has had roles in a number of movies, including Recep İvedik 2, Hadi İnşallah and 8.

Filmography

References

External links 

1984 births
Actresses from Istanbul
Turkish film actresses
Turkish television actresses
Turkish female models
Living people